WADO (1280 AM) is a commercial radio station licensed to New York City.  It is owned and operated by Uforia Audio Network, a subsidiary of Univision.  It broadcasts a Spanish-language sports radio format.

By day, WADO is powered at 50,000 watts, the maximum permitted for American AM stations.  But to protect other stations on 1280 AM from interference, at night it reduces power to 7,200 watts.  It uses a directional antenna with a four-tower array.  The transmitter is on New Jersey Route 120 in Carlstadt, New Jersey.

Programming 
WADO currently broadcasts all games of the New York Jets, and certain games for the New York Yankees, New York Knicks and New York Islanders. It previously aired the New York City FC soccer team.

Sports
New York Jets and Monday Night Football from the National Football League - Spanish language play by play from Clemson Smith-Muñiz
New York Islanders from the National Hockey League - Spanish language play by play from Bruno Vain
New York Knicks from the National Basketball Association - Spanish language play by play, produced by MSG Network, simulcast on second audio program
New York Yankees from Major League Baseball - all regular season and postseason games aired; simulcast on the second audio program of YES Network, and MLB.tv

History

WGL and WOV 
WGL was first reported in December 1926, owned by the International Broadcasting Corporation in New York City. WGL's start occurred during a period when the U.S. government had temporarily lost its authority to assign transmitting frequencies, and at the end of 1926 the station was reported to be on a non-standard frequency of 678 kHz. On January 30, 1927, the station signed on, with International Broadcasting president Colonel Lewis Landes stating on the inaugural broadcast, "The International Broadcasting Corporation's aim is to adhere to truth, to be free of partisanship, religious or political."

Full government regulation of radio was restored with the formation of the Federal Radio Commission (FRC), which on May 3, 1927 assigned WGL, now located in Secaucus, New Jersey, to 720 kHz. The next month, this was changed to 1170 kHz, with WOR in Newark moving to 710 kHz. WGL's owners wanted to remain on 720 kHz, and after WOR was awarded 710 kHz, both stations went to court, with WOR eventually winning the case. In June 1927, WGL moved to 1020 AM, sharing this frequency with a Paterson station, WODA.

In August 1927, studio manager Charles Isaacson announced one of the city's first attempts at local news coverage. WGL was organizing listeners to volunteer as radio reporters and call the station with breaking news stories. On September 16, 1928, WGL changed its call sign to WOV and was sold to Sicilian-born importer John Iraci. (The WGL call letters were then picked up by a station in Fort Wayne, Indiana.)

On November 11, 1928, with the implementation of the FRC's General Order 40, WOV was moved to 1130 kHz, with an authorization that limited it to a schedule of daytime to 6 p.m.

Italian programming 

WOV's initial programming was aimed at a general audience, but by the mid-1930s, it strengthened its ethnic ties and expanded its Italian-language programming to fill the daytime hours. WOV soon became the dominant Italian voice in the Northeast through its affiliation with share-time station WBIL and Iraci's WPEN in Philadelphia.

In early 1940 WOV made a major upgrade in facilities, when stations WPG and WBIL on 1100 kHz were deleted, and WOV moved to this vacated frequency. The next March, with the implementation of the North American Regional Broadcasting Agreement, stations on 1100 kHz were moved as a group to 1130 kHz, meaning WOV returned to its previous assignment.

November 12, 1941 call letter swap between WNEW and WOV
Later in 1941, stations WOV and WNEW traded identities, with the call letters and programming of WOV moving from 1130 to WNEW's 1280 kHz assignment, while WNEW did the reverse, with its call letters and programming moving from 1280 to WOV's 1130 kHz assignment. The Federal Communications Commission (FCC) approved the call sign changes on November 12, 1941, and the transfer was finalized on December 1, 1941, consisting of an "exchange of power, call letters and transmitting equipment between WOV and WNEW". Thus, following this exchange, the WOV call letters were now used on the station at 1280 kHz.

Top 40 and R&B 
The station was owned by WOV Broadcasting until 1959, when it was sold to Bartell Broadcasters, at which time the station call letters were changed to WADO. During the day, WADO broadcast Top 40 and R&B music. At night, it ran Italian programming. By 1962, some Spanish programming was run on weekends. By 1963, the only English programming found on WADO was its Sunday religious broadcasts.

Ethnic programming 
In 1964, WADO began broadcasting completely in Spanish from 5 a.m. to 8 p.m., and Italian from 8 p.m. to Midnight. Overnight, Asian programming was run. By 1970, Spanish had replaced the Asian format.

Musical programming 
In terms of music, the station played a blend of Spanish MOR and Spanish oldies. WADO evolved to a Spanish adult contemporary music and oldies format by the mid-1970s. Italian programming was dropped in 1971.

Four full-time Spanish stations battled for listeners during the 1980s:  WADO along with WKDM 1380, WSKQ 620, and WJIT 1480.  Only WADO remains as a secular Spanish-language station.  WKDM airs Spanish Christian radio programming, and the other two have ethnic programs in Russian and Korean.

Ownership changes
The station was sold to Command Broadcasting in 1979. In 1986, Heftel bought the station, and over the next three years, moved to a Spanish language adult contemporary music and talk format. By the early-1990s, WADO was a Spanish language news and talk station.

In March 1996 the company bought WPAT and put a Spanish MOR format there, which would later grow to cover additional languages such as Korean. In 1997, Heftel restructured into Hispanic Broadcasters. The company sold WPAT to Multicultural, and acquired WNWK from them]. The brokered shows from WNWK went to WPAT and WCAA went to a Spanish tropical format. WADO remained News and Talk.

In 2002, Hispanic Broadcasting was sold to Univision, making WADO and 96.3 WXNY-FM both Univision-owned and operated stations.

On December 20, 2016, Univision announced that WADO would be one of the charter network affiliates of Univision Deportes Radio, the company's new Spanish-language sports network launched on April 19, 2017.

On June 3, 2022, Univision announced it would sell a package of 18 radio stations across 10 of its markets, primarily AM outlets in large cities (including WADO) and entire clusters in smaller markets such as McAllen, Texas, and Fresno, California, for $60 million to a new company known as Latino Media Network (LMN); Univision proposes to handle operations for a year under agreement before turning over operational control to LMN in the fourth quarter of 2023.

Power increase
In the 1990s the FCC began to entertain the idea of power increases on formerly regional channels like 1280. Application was made to raise day power from 5,000 watts on two towers to 50,000 watts on a four-tower system. This remained on file, and was periodically amended as the ownership changed. In 1998 the FCC granted a construction permit (CP) for daytime operation at 50,000 watts. While planning the rebuilt site, Engineering Director David Stewart hit on the idea of a night power increase using the proposed extra day towers. CP was granted for 7,200 watts. The new system went on air in 2000 using a Harris DX-50 transmitter for days and a DX-10 for nights. The phasing and coupling equipment was designed by Ron Rackley at duTreil, Lundin and Rackley.

References

External links
 

FCC History Cards for WBBR covers 1938-1981 as WOV / WNEW. This card set starts with formation of "new" WOV, a consolidation of "old" WOV, WPG and WBIL, which was eventually assigned to AM 1130. On November 12, 1941, the WOV call letters were swapped to AM 1280, while AM 1130 became WNEW. Still later, in 1992, this station on AM 1130 became WBBR.)
FCC History Cards for WADO (covers 1934-1981 as WNEW / WOV / WADO. This card set starts with WNEW's creation in 1934, as a consolidation of WODA and WAAM, which was eventually assigned to AM 1280. On November 12, 1941, the WNEW call letters were swapped to AM 1130, while AM 1280 became WOV. Still later, on November 1, 1950, this station on AM 1280 became WADO.)

Further reading
 The Airwaves of New York: Illustrated Histories of 156 AM Stations in the Metropolitan Area, 1921-1996 by Bill Jaker, Frank Sulek and Peter Kanze, 1998.

ADO
News and talk radio stations in the United States
Sports radio stations in the United States
ADO
Univision Radio Network stations